Ideation may refer to:
Ideation (creative process), the process of creating new ideas
Homicidal ideation, homicidal thoughts
Suicidal ideation, suicidal thoughts
Paranoid ideation, paranoia

See also
Meditation, the process by which human consciousness reaches deeper states of awareness
Constructivism (international relations)